Soohyun & Hoon (Korean: 수현 & 훈) are a two-member vocal unit of South Korean pop group U-KISS.

Background 
Soohyun debuted as one of the original members of U-KISS in 2008, while Hoon joined the group in 2011.

2013: first promotions 
Soohyun & Hoon first performed together with the song "아픔보다 아픈" (More Painful than Pain), which was released on the U-KISS album 'Collage'. The duo then promoted the song on various South Korean music shows.

2019–2020: return From mandatory military service 
Soohyun completed his Military service in 2019, while Hoon completed his service in 2020 

On return from Military duties, Soohyun & Hoon released a cover of their U-KISS group song 'Come Back To Me' 2020 Version.

2021: I Wish 
Soohyun & Hoon announced that they were planning a comeback album on January 27, 2021. The single 'I Wish', will be released in both a Korean and Japanese version.

References 

21st-century South Korean singers
South Korean musical duos